Pyrones or pyranones are a class of heterocyclic chemical compounds. They contain an unsaturated six-membered ring containing one oxygen atom and a ketone functional group. There are two isomers denoted as 2-pyrone and 4-pyrone. The 2-pyrone (or α-pyrone) structure is found in nature as part of the coumarin ring system. 4-Pyrone (or γ-pyrone) is found in some natural chemical compounds such as chromone, maltol and kojic acid.

See also 
 Furanone, which has one fewer carbon atom in the ring.

References